Laoponia is a genus of Southeast Asian araneomorph spiders in the family Caponiidae, first described by Norman I. Platnick & Peter Jäger in 2008.  it contains only two species.

References

Araneomorphae genera
Caponiidae
Spiders of Asia